The Toyota Corolla (E140/E150) is the tenth generation of cars sold by Toyota under the Corolla nameplate. The Toyota Auris replaced the Corolla hatchback in Japan and Europe, but was still badged "Corolla" in Australia and New Zealand.

The chassis of the E140 is based on the Toyota MC platform, with the E150 model deriving from the New MC platform. In other words, the Japanese market E140 carried its MC platform over from the previous E120. The versions sold in the Americas, Southeast Asia and the Middle East are based on the widened edition of this platform. Models sold in Australia, Europe and South Africa used the more sophisticated New MC underpinnings, and were thus designated as E150. The wide-body E150 was first released in China and Europe in early 2007, while the wide-body E140 was released in Americas and parts of Asia later in the year.

E140 narrow-body

Japan 
The tenth-generation Corolla (E140) was released in Japan on 10 October 2006. The saloon is now known as the Corolla Axio. The Axio name was created from the Greek word "axia", meaning "things with value". The estate version retains the Corolla Fielder name. The dimensions for the Corolla sold in Japan are smaller than vehicles made for export so as to remain in compliance with Japanese government regulations concerning exterior dimensions and engine displacement.

The Corolla Axio gets Toyota's latest intelligent parking-assist system. A backup camera monitor is standard. On Japanese models only, G-BOOK, a subscription telematics service, is offered as an option. The Luxel being the highest trim level, offers additional features such as Dynamic radar Cruise Control and tiptronic transmission. The G mid range model receives a set of projector headlamps, factory-fitted audio system with steering audio controls, Push button start, speedometer clusters with additional tachometer clusters and automatic climate controls.

The Japanese model included a rear-view monitor which displays an image of the area at the rear of the vehicle while backing up to reduce the burden on the driver while parking. Also, the optional Intelligent Parking Assist system supports steering operations when parallel parking and backing into a parking space. Ultrasonic sensors installed on the front of the vehicle detect other parked vehicles and, based on the results, estimate the physical dimensions of a vacant parking space and set the target parking position.

The Corolla Axio introduced a Pre-Crash Safety System that uses millimeter-wave radar. When the millimeter-wave radar detects a high risk of collision, the Pre-Crash Seatbelts improves initial restraint capabilities for passengers while the Pre-Crash Brake Assist System decelerates the vehicle to reduce the collision speed and contribute to less damage induced by collision. The Radar Cruise Control system detects and monitors the preceding vehicle and the lane, maintaining a fixed distance according to the preceding vehicle's speed within a preset range of speed.

Both the Corolla Axio and Corolla Fielder received their facelift on 28 October 2008. The Corolla Axio only received a redesigned front grille and rear lights, while the Corolla Fielder also received a redesigned front bumper.

In 2011, a total of 70,758 Corolla Axios were sold in Japan.

Pre-facelift styling (2006–2008)

Post-facelift styling (2008–2012)

The Axio GT is a version based on Corolla Axio based on the Axio N2 race car. The vehicle went on sale in February 2009 in Japan.

The GT TRD and TRD GT Packages are accessory packages for Corolla Axio (GT TRD) and Corolla Fielder (TRD GT).

In motorsport use, Team apr participated in GT300 class of Super GT, replacing their MR-S with a midship layout Axio E141 in 2009 season.

The Corolla Axio apr GT (NZE141) is a Corolla Axio race car for 2009 SUPER GT GT300 class race. The apr GT race car weighs roughly at 1100 kg. The vehicle No.74 was unveiled at the 2009 Tokyo Auto Salon.

E140 wide-body 
The wide-body version of the E140 Corolla was released from late 2007 as a 2008 model year and is larger in dimensions, while retaining many aspects in styling found on the Japanese model. In July 2010, a facelift to the Corolla Altis was introduced, with new ZR engines replacing the ZZ engines found on the 1.6L and 1.8L models. New bumpers, grille, air dams, rear combination lamps differentiate the facelift from the earlier model years.

A subtle difference between the E140 wide body and that of the E150 wide body would be at the front and rear fender panel lines that are between the front and the rear wheel arch; the international E140 has in-built side skirts that fuses with the side profile of the car while the E150 does not.

The models which use a wider and longer version of the Axio's platform, have styling similar to that of the Camry's while providing a list of added equipment towards its interior standard list.

A facelift was done in mid-2010, which revised the front and rear fascia of the Corolla with new bumpers and slimmer grille reminiscent to the Camry. New ZR engines replaced the outgoing ZZ engines for the 1.6-litre and 1.8-litre models.

Asia 
Hong Kong
In Hong Kong, Corollas sold were based on the international market models and the Corolla was fitted with the 1.5-litre 1NZ-FE engine. The Corolla sold in Hong Kong is made in Japan, although it does vary from the Japanese market model with minor revisions to the front such as the headlamps and air dams. It is available in Luxury and Advantage variants.

India
The Indian version of the Corolla marketed as 'Corolla Altis' is assembled in Bidadi near Bangalore. The pre-facelift version (2008–2010) had a 1.8-litre ZZ engine with 132 bhp mated to a 5-speed manual or a 4-speed automatic gearbox. A 1.4-litre 1ND-TV diesel engine unique to India and Spain with 88 bhp mated to a 6-speed manual gearbox debuted in 2010. In 2011, the Altis was facelifted and the older ZZ engine was replaced by an updated 1.8 ZR engine producing 140 bhp and was mated to a 6-speed manual like the diesel while a CVT gearbox replaced the outdated 4-speed automatic. The diesel was left untouched mechanically and had a different grill to differentiate it from the petrol.

Indonesia

The Corolla Altis was launched on 28 February 2008, and offered in the base J, popular mid-level G, and luxury V trim levels. All were powered by the 1.8-litre 1ZZ-FE engine with VVT-i. The J is only available with manual transmission, while the G and V are automatic only. On 30 April 2009, the V's 1.8-litre 1ZZ-FE engine was replaced with a 2.0-litre 3ZR-FE engine, mated to an automatic transmission. The G and V trim levels featured smart entry with start button system and automatic climate control.

In July 2010, the facelifted Corolla Altis was launched with the new 1.8-litre 2ZR-FE engine with Dual VVT-i. The 1.8 J was replaced with the new 1.8 E as the base trim level. Mated with the new engines, the base but sporty 1.8 E received a 6-speed manual transmission, while the 1.8 G and 2.0 V came with a CVT.

Malaysia

As with Indonesia, the Corolla Altis was launched in March 2008 in Malaysia as well. It was offered in 5 variants – 1.8G, 1.8G Sporty, 1.8E, 1.8E Sporty and 1.6E. All variants were equipped with the 1ZZ-FE engine model with the exception of the 1.6E, that used the 3ZZ-FE engine. Manual transmission for the Corolla Altis was not available in Malaysia. Each of these 5 variants came with 4-speed automatic transmission with Super ECT.

Output for the 1.8 model was 97 kW @6000 rpm with @4200 rpm. Output for the 1.6 model was 80 kW @6000 rpm with @4400 rpm.

On 23 September 2010, a facelift to the Corolla Altis was launched where the ZZ engines were replaced with ZR engines. Toyota Malaysia has designated the new variants as 2.0V, 1.8G, 1.8E and 1.6E. All variants' engines are mated with CVT – except the 1.6E remained with Super ECT 4-speed automatic transmission.

Specifications for the facelifted models are:

Pakistan

In Pakistan, the E140 Corolla was launched in August 2008. It was offered in 4 trim levels: XLi, GLi, Corolla Altis and Corolla Diesel. The facelift version was launched in April 2011.

The XLi is offered with Toyota's 85 hp, 1.3L 2NZ-FE engine. Pakistan was the only market to use the 2NZ-FE in the Corolla. This model does not have airbags, ABS or power windows. It is only offered in two colours, black and white.

The GLi is offered with the same 1.3L engine as the XLi but it comes equipped with ABS, and power windows. No airbags are offered on this model. Metallic colours are available in the GLi.

The Corolla diesel has 2 trim levels: Corolla 2.0D and the Corolla 2.0D Saloon.

The Corolla 2.0D comes equipped with Toyota's 1989 2C engine which produces 74 hp. The model does not have airbags, ABS or power windows. It is only offered in two colours: black and white.

The Corolla 2.0D Saloon has the same engine as the Corolla 2.0D. The model is only available with a 5-speed manual. The 2.0D Saloon comes equipped with alloy rims, side skirts, optitron speedometer, wooden inserts in the interior and a single driver side airbag. Optional extra on the model is the sunroof.

The facelift for the Corolla was launched on 11 April 2011. Initially only the XLi and GLi trims were available, with modifications to the front and rear lights, front grill, and bumpers, along with a revised interior colour scheme. The 1.8L model with the 1ZZ-FE engine was ceased and was replaced with the 1.6L model with the 1ZR-FE engine producing 122 bhp. The facelift Altis was launched in May 2011. The Altis comes with wood grain panel inserts in the interior, optitron speedometer, 5-spoke alloy rims, fog lamps, power windows, power seats, ABS with EBD, driver side SRS airbag and a 6-speed (forward) manual transmission. Optional on the Altis is a 4-speed super ECT automatic transmission and sunroof.

The GLi model is also offered with a 4-speed super ECT automatic transmission and the 1.6L 1ZR-FE engine. This version of the GLi is the same as the 1.3L GLi, albeit with the 1.6L engine and the 4-speed ECT automatic transmission, hence making it very similar to the Altis, save for the alloy rims and the wooden inserts in the interior.

Philippines
The tenth generation Corolla was launched as the Corolla Altis in the Philippines on 7 March 2008. It has three variants, the 2.0, 1.8 and 1.6 V, all came with automatic transmission, the 1.6 G available in either manual or automatic transmission, and the 1.6 E, with manual transmission. The 1.6-litre and 1.8-litre engine is the same 3ZZ-FE and 1ZZ-FE motor used in the ninth generation Corolla, whereas the 2.0-litre variant is powered by the newer 3ZR-FE engine equipped with Dual VVT-i technology.

Toyota Motors Philippines upgraded the Corolla Altis in September 2010. The 2.0V is equipped with CVT to replace the 4-speed AT while the manual transmission for the 1.6 variants have 6 gears instead of the previous 5. All variants uses the newer ZR engines equipped with Dual VVT-i technology.

A minor update to the Altis was launched in the later part of 2011. It now has a redesigned front and rear fascia and updated wheel designs. It now has powered windows and central-locking doors as standard. It has 4 variants:

 2.0 V (3ZR-FE)Sport variant, only available with a CVT and Paddle Shift. It has a mesh grille instead of the bar-type, smoked High Intensity Discharge (HID) headlamps with manual levelling, wipers with auto rain sensor, leather seats, powered seats and folding mirrors and sports package pre-installed.
 1.6 V (1ZR-FE)Range-topping variant, has almost the same specs as the 2.0V, except the mesh grille and sport packages, although these are optional. It is only available with a 4-speed automatic transmission.
 1.6 G (1ZR-FE)Middle variant, with an option for a 4-speed automatic or a 6-speed manual transmission. Has the same specs as the V variant without leather seats.
 1.6 E (1ZR-FE)Base variant, only available with a 6-speed manual transmission, with much fewer equipment and colour choices. No leather seats, no auto climate control (uses manual switch knobs), no fog lamps, no Toyota factory fitted alarm system.

Singapore

Singapore received the E140 Corolla Altis on 6 December 2007, and it was the first Asian market to receive the 10th generation Corolla. The same 1.6-litre 3ZZ-FE and 1.8-litre 1ZZ-FE engines were used from the previous generation and continued to be marketed in both 1.6 and 1.8-litre versions. Automatic transmissions were only available to meet Euro IV emissions standards at that time. In late 2008 for a short period, the Altis was offered with racing bodykit alongside the Vios including a low bootlid spoiler, aftermarket 16" rims, brushed silver gear knob and pedals, with a "racing" badge to differentiate its special run. Thereafter in late 2009, the trims for the 1.6 model were split into LX and Elegance, with the latter having multi-spoke 15-inch rims, foglamps, leather seats, chromed inner door handles and touchscreen audio head-unit with reversing camera included.

In September 2010, the facelifted model of the Altis was introduced, utilising Dual VVT-i engine technology (i.e. 1ZR-FE) for the 1.6-litre version and the engines met the Euro V emissions standards. In 2012 onwards, models did away without foglamps and it received factory installed head-unit installed on the Elegance trim. The 1.6 model was a more popular choice which made it Singapore's No.1 Car for consecutive years.

There is also a Japanese market model (including Axio saloon and Fielder estate) available under parallel import status (parallel dealers buy the vehicle overseas and do the shipping, custom declaration, vehicle testing & warranty by themselves) from smaller agencies instead of buying from the local dealer. Grades available are the standard X variant and the higher-spec G variant. The Japanese market model, along with the Japanese market Camry and Wish, were once fitted with CNG and used on a small number of taxis there.

Sri Lanka
A Japanese-built version of the Corolla saloon is sold in Sri Lanka. The petrol version is offered with the 1.6-litre 3ZZ engine while the diesel version on offer has the 2-litre 2C engine with 5-speed manual transmission only. The body shape is same as ASEAN-marketed Corolla Altis design. This model is locally known as the Corolla 141.

Taiwan
The Corolla Altis was launched on 2 February 2008, and offered in the base J, popular mid-level G, and luxury V trim levels. All were powered by the 1.8-litre 1ZZ-FE engine with VVT-i. The 1.6-litre 3ZZ-FE engine with VVT-i, while the G and V are automatic only. In early 2009, the J's 1.6-litre 3ZZ-FE engine was replaced with a 2.0-litre 3ZR-FE engine, mated to an automatic transmission. The G and V trim levels feature smart entry and start system and automatic climate control.

In July 2010, Toyota facelifted the Corolla Altis with new bumpers, grille, air dams, rear combination lamps, including the newer 1.8-litre 2ZR-FE engine with Dual VVT-i. The 1.8 J was replaced with new 1.8 E as the base trim level. Mated with the new engines, the 1.8 E and 2.0 E came with a CVT.

Thailand
The Corolla Altis introduced in Thailand on 24 January 2008, which currently manufactures the Corolla Altis, is offered a total of four grades (J, E, G and V). Thailand was the only country that offered all existing grades of the new Altis, whilst export markets are only given a fraction of the Thai range in varying combinations.

The 1.8-litre and 2.0-litre variants of the facelifted Corolla Altis are fitted with Super CVT-i gearbox while the 1.6-litre variants remain using the same 4-speed auto gearbox as earlier. Grades available for the Corolla Altis in Thailand varies from the basic 1.6J to the high spec 2.0V Navi variant. The facelifted 1.8-litre variant is fitted with the 2ZR-FBE Flexifuel engine.

North America 

The North American Corolla (E140) has a completely different exterior design from the Japanese Corolla Axio, and instead retains the ASEAN-marketed Corolla Altis design. This Corolla was unveiled on 31 October 2007, at the SEMA show in Las Vegas, started production in November 2007 and became available in US dealerships in January 2008, as a 2009 model. Only the saloon is sold, although the second generation Corolla Matrix (commonly referred to as just "Matrix"), which shares the E140 platform and engines, is considered the Corolla's hatchback counterpart.

The new Corolla has similar styling cues to its bigger brother, the Toyota Camry, while also having styling commonality with its little brother, the Yaris. Overall driving dynamics have been improved compared to its predecessor through the use of a new Electronic Power Steering system as well as an upgraded suspension and improved chassis. The interior quality has been improved through the use of new materials and the addition of more room for passengers. Reviewers note that the Corolla represents a gradual evolution over the previous iteration, without straying too far from the formula as a plain but reliable, fuel-efficient, simple and inexpensive form of transportation.

A total of five trim levels (Standard, S, LE, XLE and XRS) are being offered in the US, Canada has 4 trim levels (CE, LE, Sport (or S) and XRS). The LE and S have a similar MSRP and are very similar mechanically, the main differences being the S's spoiler, underskirts and silver interior highlights. The XRS also has a spoiler and underskirts like the S, but it has a larger 2.4 L engine, rear disc brakes, a sport-tuned suspension, and standard stability and traction control.

The base (standard and CE) and S trims are available with either a five-speed manual or four-speed automatic transmission, while the LE (unlike the previous generation) and XLE are automatic only. Corollas with the 1.8-litre engine have an EPA fuel economy rating of 27 mpg city/35 mpg highway. The 2.4-litre is rated at 22 mpg/30 mpg with the automatic and 22 mpg/29 mpg with the manual. All engines are ULEV II certified. Toyota carried over the 13.2 gal fuel tank from earlier models. In order to help improve fuel economy, the new Corolla uses an electric-power-steering unit instead of a belt-driven-hydraulic pump.

The Corolla offers technological conveniences such as an auxiliary audio jack for MP3 players, upgraded JBL audio, tilt/telescopic steering wheel, steering wheel-mounted audio controls, a purse hook, and a hands-free Bluetooth mobile phone system. Traction control and Vehicle Stability Control (VSC) are standard on the top-of-the-line XRS, and are available as options on the US market LE and XLE trims.

In 2009 (2010 US model year vehicles), S models received the Optitron XRS gauges as standard equipment and new 16-inch steel wheel cover designs. XLE models were now available with an optional automatic climate control and a metallic finish to the steering wheel panels. All models now have The Star Safety System includes Vehicle Stability Control (VSC), Traction Control (TRAC), Anti-lock Braking System (ABS), Electronic Brake-force Distribution (EBD), Brake Assist (BA) and Smart Stop Technology brake override system as standard equipment.

In Mexico, the Corolla is offered in three trim levels: LE which comes standard with 16-inch steel wheels and wheel covers and with both manual and automatic transmission, then the mid-range XLE now comes with 16-inch alloy wheels and wood inserts in the interior and it is only available with an automatic transmission, and the XRS with the 2.4-litre 2AZ-FE I4 engine. The Mexican-spec Corolla is built at the Cambridge plant in Ontario. Canada, Mexico and the US are the only countries that receive the Corolla from this assembly plant.

For the 2011 model year, the XRS and XLE trims were discontinued for the US market (XRS is still available in Canada). The revised Corolla features new front and rear exterior styling and interior design changes, including a redesigned front grille, headlights, front and rear bumpers, new wheel designs, rear chrome garnish, rear combination lamps and boot lid. The interior adds a metallic trim (LE and S trims), new fabrics and a sport tilt/telescopic steering wheel (S grade). Corolla also features two new colours, Nautical Blue Metallic and Sandy Beach Metallic. New standard features for the LE trim include cruise control, Remote Keyless Entry, two additional audio speakers and variable intermittent windshield wipers with a mist cycle. The S trim adds standard cruise control, Remote Keyless Entry, 16-inch alloy wheels and a colour-keyed rear deck spoiler.

In 2011 (for the 2012 model year), the Corolla received a few feature upgrades, including a new standard audio system with the USB port, Bluetooth and steering audio controls for the US and Canadian LE trim. The US Corolla L received power windows, power door locks and remote keyless entry.

The Corolla comes standard with dual front airbags, front and rear row side curtain airbags and front row side torso airbags. ABS and active headrests are also standard. Beginning in 2009 (2010 model year), Toyota's Vehicle Stability Control and traction control became standard on all trims.

The Insurance Institute for Highway Safety gave the Corolla its Top Safety Pick accolade. The Corolla earned a Good overall score in the front impact crash test, with Good marks in all six measured front impact categories. And the Corolla received another Good overall score for the side impact crash test.  The Corolla nearly earned perfect marks in all nine measured side impact test categories but was given an Average score for rear passenger pelvis/leg protection.  However the Corolla earned a Good rating in the side impact structure/safety category which is uncommon in compact car segment.

Certain 2009 to 2010 model year Toyota Corollas (mainly US-built models with VIN# beginning in "1NX" or "2T1") were subject to the 2010 Toyota vehicle recalls regarding floor mat and accelerator pedal replacement.

On 10 October 2012, Toyota issued a recall for 2009 model year Corolla and Matrix, along with ten other models. The recall notices stated that improperly lubricated driver's side power window master switch may develop a “notchy” or sticky feel, and that improper aftermarket lubrication may present a fire hazard. The repair involves lubricating the switch assembly with a special fluorine grease.

Latin America 

The tenth generation Corolla was launched in Brazil on 26 March 2008, and in Argentina in April 2008. It was produced in Brazil with two engines (a 1.6 and a 1.8-litre petrol engine – petrol/ethanol in Brazil) and three models: the base XLi, the intermediate XEi and the higher spec SE-G.

The 2.0 VVT-i Flex was added in March 2010. All versions are based on the wide-body saloon.

Bolivia
The Toyota Corolla E150 made in Japan is sold in Bolivia by Toyota Bolivia. Grey imports allow sale in Bolivia US Spec from USA/Canada/Japan and Corolla Axio from Japan.

Jamaica
The tenth generation Corolla went on sale in Jamaica in October 2007. It is available in 1.5L and 1.8L models. The 1.5L breaks down into two models; the first of which comes without alloy wheels and fog lamps and the other with alloy wheels and fog lamps. The 1.8L model however, comes standard with leather interior and a sunroof. All models feature 4-wheel anti-lock disc brakes.

Safety
The Corolla XEI with 2 airbags for Latin America received 4 stars for adult occupants and 1 star for toddlers from Latin NCAP in 2010.

E150 wide-body 
The E150 version appears identical to the E140 wide-body, but has a subtle difference in the front and rear fender panel lines between the front and rear wheel arc region. Its chassis has a different, more sophisticated underpinnings based on the New MC platform. The global debut of the international variant of the tenth generation Corolla was staged in November 2006 at the Beijing Auto Show.

China 

The Corolla E150 was launched at the 2006 Beijing Auto Show and commenced production in 2007. It was built at its plant in Tianjin, and the facelift arrived in September 2010 for the 2011 model year. Engine and gearbox choices available were the 1.6-litre 1ZR-FE, 1.8 litre 2ZR-FE and the 2.0-litre 3ZR-FE paired with the 5-speed manual and 4 speed-automatic for the 1.6 GL models while the 6-speed manual and CVT gearboxes were standard on 1.8GL, 1.8GLX and 2.0GLX models. Pricing ranged between 131,800 yuan and 199,800 yuan (US$25,730–$39,000). Production ended in June 2014 when the Toyota Corolla (E180) replaced it.

Africa 
South Africa
This generation of the Corolla was launched in South Africa in September 2007. Unlike in some countries, Corolla mainly refers to the saloon and not the hatchback, which in South Africa is known as the Toyota Auris. This generation is lower and wider than its predecessor. Toyota South Africa Motors achieved a new all-time sales record for the South African motor industry in October 2007 with the Corolla (including Auris) leading the vehicle sales chart.

Toyota's manufacturing plant in Durban provides the Corolla, Hilux and Fortuner model exports to Europe. The European-spec Corolla made in Durban has been awarded a EURO NCAP 5-star rating (applies to all models in the range with knee airbags).

The car is available in the following models: 2.0 Diesel (Exclusive, Advanced); 1.8 Petrol (Exclusive, Exclusive Auto, Advanced); 1.6 Petrol (Advanced, Professional); and 1.4 Petrol (Advanced, Professional).

From the start of June 2014 the Corolla was re-launched as the Corolla Quest, which is a scaled-down model with less features as to target the entry level class B buyers. The Quest has been released with 1.6-litre engine in both 6-speed manual and 4-speed automatic transmissions.

Australasia 

Australia

The new Corolla was introduced to the Australian market on 18 May 2007. It was available in both saloon and hatchback models, with more safety features and higher levels of luxury. The new 1.8-litre 2ZR-FE Dual VVT-i - with variable valve timing for both intake and exhaust camshafts - was the only engine available for the Australian model. It promised better fuel economy than its predecessor whilst retaining its 100 kW power output. This figure decreased when the previous model's 1.8-litre four-cylinder engine dropped to 93 kW of power and 161 Nm of torque (from 171 Nm) in late 2005 to meet the 2006 Euro IV emissions requirements. A new 6-speed manual gearbox was standard, with a 4-speed automatic optional, despite speculation of a 5-speed like the new Honda Civic, a robotised 5-speed optional in the European Auris, or a CVT available in the Japanese model.

All Australian models of Corolla ran on the E150 platform, unlike the North American and Asian versions. Therefore, certain chassis parts were not interchangeable.

The new Corolla was available in five trim levels for the hatch (Ascent, Ascent Sport, Conquest, Levin SX and Levin ZR) and four for the saloon (Ascent, Ascent Sport, Conquest and Ultima - auto only), with the Corolla estate discontinued in Australia. The Levin ZR and Ultima grade featured HID xenon headlamps, rain sensing wipers, smart entry and start system and automatic climate control. Safety equipment levels was also improved with ABS brakes and dual airbags standard across the range, whilst side, curtain, driver's knee airbag and stability and traction control was optional on Ascent and Levin SX models and standard on Conquest, Levin ZR and Ultima models from December 2008 production. Other changes from December 2008 production included a revised six-speed manual transmission across all models except the auto only Ultima saloon that had improved gear ratios and the adoption of smart entry activation on front passenger and back door on Levin ZR model. Although the new hatch was badged Auris name in most world markets, the Corolla name was retained for the Australian market.

The Corolla received a four star ANCAP safety rating for occupant safety and a three star rating for pedestrian safety.

New Zealand
Like Australia, all models are marketed under the Corolla nameplate. The range is similar to the Australian range with the same engines and drivetrain, however, models are designated as the base GX and higher spec GLX. What distinguishes the New Zealand range from the rest of the world is the addition of the Corolla Fielder estate version, which is otherwise only seen in the Japan market. With estate cars so popular in New Zealand, demand for the previous model was enough to justify it. New Zealand is the only export market for the estate. It is marketed as the Corolla GX Wagon with the 1NZ-FE engine. While the hatch and saloon feature the 1.8-litre 2ZR-FE Dual VVT-i, the estate features the Japanese market 1.5-litre, 4-cylinder, 16-valve, DOHC VVT-i engine. It is specified lower than the GX model hatch and saloon due to the estate being aimed at the price-conscious fleet market and priced accordingly. The hatchback gained two diesel motors in June 2008, with both the 1.4 and 2.0 D4-D engines joining the local range, albeit only with manual transmissions. The diesel cars are European spec models built in Japan, the 1.4 version having its motor shipped from Europe to be placed in the New Zealand spec cars.

Toyota was widely criticised by the motoring press for selling the new Corolla in Australia and New Zealand without Electronic Stability Control, which can reduce the chances of a fatal accident by up to 55 percent. Electronic Stability Control has been available on American versions of the Corolla for several years. The stability control concern was partially addressed with the diesel Corollas offering ESC as standard. The facelift in 2010 saw the addition of the safety equipment on all models bar the Japanese-spec estate.

Europe 
In Ireland, the E150 series Corolla was launched in December 2006 for sale in January 2007. That made it one of the first countries in the world to receive this model. The saloon version is available along with the Auris (and an Auris van) with a 1.4-litre 97 bhp (71 kW) 4ZZ-FE petrol engine or a 1.4-litre 90 bhp D-4D diesel engine in Terra, Strata, Luna and Sol trim levels (estate is not available). European models are built in Turkey and Japan. Saloon versions are more popular in Ireland than the recently launched Auris.

However, British buyers were only offered the Auris, although Toyota did offer the E150 in Belgium, Luxembourg and Spain.

References

External links

Cars introduced in 2006
2010s cars
Euro NCAP small family cars
Latin NCAP small family cars
Motor vehicles manufactured in the United States
Vehicles with CVT transmission
140